
Coatl (also spelled cohuatl, couatl, or cuatl) is a Nahuatl word meaning "serpent" or "twin". It is the name of one of the day-signs in the Aztec Calendar. It can also refer to:

 Coatl, a character from the 1945 novel, Captain from Castile (novel)
 Also appears in the 1947 film adaptation, Captain from Castile
 Couatl (Dungeons & Dragons), a type of creature in the Dungeons & Dragons fantasy roleplaying game
 Coatl (wood), a type of wood also used in traditional medicine
 Lamborghini Coatl, a Lamborghini concept vehicle

See also
 Coatli (disambiguation), a Nahuatl word referring to several medicinal plants
 Quetzalcoatl, the Aztec deity whose name means "feathered serpent"

Nahuatl words and phrases